Victor Torres is an American microbiologist. He is the C.V. Starr Professor of Microbiology at the New York University Grossman School of Medicine, where he also serves as director of the Antimicrobial-Resistant Pathogens (AMR) Program. He is a 2021 MacArthur Fellow.

Education
1995−2000, Bachelor of Sciences: Concentration in Industrial Microbiology, University of Puerto Rico at Mayagüez, Mayagüez, Puerto Rico.

2000−2004, Doctor of Philosophy (PhD): Microbiology and Immunology, Vanderbilt University School of Medicine, Nashville, Tennessee.

2005, Postdoctoral Fellow: Division of Infectious Diseases, Vanderbilt University School of Medicine, Nashville, Tennessee.

2006−2008, Postdoctoral Fellow: Department of Microbiology and Immunology, Vanderbilt University School of Medicine, Nashville, Tennessee. 
.

References

Living people
Puerto Rican scientists
American microbiologists
MacArthur Fellows
New York University Grossman School of Medicine faculty
People from Rincón, Puerto Rico
University of Puerto Rico at Mayagüez people
Vanderbilt University School of Medicine alumni
1977 births